The women's points race at the 2002 Commonwealth Games was part of the cycling programme, which took place on 30 July 2002.

This track cycling event consists of a single race. During the race, cyclists can score points in two ways; the cyclist with the most points at the end of the race wins. The first way to score points is to lap the group. Each time a cyclist gained a full lap on the peloton, she scored 10 points. The other method of scoring points was to place in the intermediate sprints. The first four cyclists in each of ten sprints would score, with the first finisher getting 5 points, the second 3, the third 2, and the fourth 1 point.

Results
The race started at 20:30.

References

Women's points race
Cycling at the Commonwealth Games – Women's points race
Comm